Pterothysanus is a genus of moths of the family Callidulidae.

Species
Pterothysanus atratus Butler, 1885
Pterothysanus laticilia Walker, 1854
Pterothysanus pictus Butler, 1884

References

Callidulidae
Moth genera